Sport Central is a multi-purpose built sports centre and events arena that is located in the centre of Newcastle upon Tyne, England. It forms part of the Northumbria University campus, in the city centre. The centre houses facilities for swimming, track running, climbing, golf, squash, basketball, netball, badminton, and volleyball. The main sports and events arena has a capacity for over 2,800 spectators.

History
Sport Central opened in 2010, at a cost of £30 million. It was previously the home venue of British Basketball League team Newcastle Eagles, and Netball Superleague side Team Northumbria. The arena has also hosted international basketball, when the senior men's Great Britain national team staged a game there, featuring NBA star Luol Deng.

See also
Northumbria University

References

External links
Sport Central website
Sport Central Main Arena website
Northumbria University Sport Central website

Basketball venues in England
Indoor arenas in England
Sports venues in Newcastle upon Tyne
Newcastle Eagles
Sport at Northumbria University
Netball venues in England
University sports venues in the United Kingdom